Lynes's cisticola (Cisticola distinctus) is a species of bird in the family Cisticolidae. It is found in Uganda and Kenya. Its natural habitat is subtropical or tropical high-altitude grassland.

Lynes's cisticola is sometimes considered as a subspecies species of the wailing cisticola (Cisticola lais). The vernacular name commemorates the amateur ornithologist Rear Admiral Hubert Lynes.

References

Cisticola
Birds of Sub-Saharan Africa
Lynes's cisticola